Adam Larkin (born 14 February 1974) is an Australian rugby union footballer. He played for Ulster. He currently coaches Belfast Harlequins.

References

1974 births
Living people
Australian rugby union players
Ulster Rugby players
Place of birth missing (living people)